NIPA, Nipa or nipah may refer to:

 Shamim Ara Nipa, Bangladeshi dancer and choreographer
 Nipa hut, a type of stilt house indigenous to the cultures of the Philippines
 Nipah virus, a Henipavirus

NIPA 
 National Income and Product Accounts, one of the main sources of data on general economic activity in the United States
 National IT Industry Promotion Agency, an IT industry promotion organization operated by the Government of South Korea
 National Institute of Public Administration (Malaysia), a Malaysian government agency responsible for the training of civil servants
 National Institute of Public Administration (Pakistan), a school to impart training for Civil Servants of Pakistan
 NIPA1, a gene in humans that encodes Non-imprinted in Prader-Willi/Angelman syndrome region protein 1
 NIPA2, a gene in humans that encodes Non-imprinted in Prader-Willi/Angelman syndrome region protein 2

Plants 
 Nipa palm, Nypa fruticans
 Nipa grass, Distichlis palmeri
 Pisang Nipah or saba banana, a banana cultivar

Places 
 Nipa, a Barangay in Palapag, Philippines
 Nipa Rural LLG in Southern Highlands Province, Papua New Guinea

See also 

Nina (name)
Niña (name)
 Nypa (disambiguation)